Soulayma Jebrani (born 25 February 1997) is a Tunisian footballer who plays as a goalkeeper for Turkish Women's Football Super League club Fatih Vatan Spor and the Tunisia women's national team.

Club career
Jebrani has played for Women's Association of Sousse in Tunisia.

In December 2021, she moved to Turkey and joined the Women's Super League club Fatih Vatan Spor.

International career
Jebrani has capped for Tunisia at senior level, including in a 2–1 friendly away win over Jordan on 10 June 2021.

See also
List of Tunisia women's international footballers

References

External links

1997 births
Living people
People from Sousse
Tunisian women's footballers
Women's association football goalkeepers
Fatih Vatan Spor players
Turkish Women's Football Super League players
Tunisia women's international footballers
Tunisian expatriate footballers
Tunisian expatriate sportspeople in Turkey
Expatriate women's footballers in Turkey
20th-century Tunisian women
21st-century Tunisian women
Saudi Women's Premier League players